José Luis Cordero Manzanares (born 31 January 1987) in Costa Rica is a footballer who plays as a midfielder.

Club career
Cordero came through the Saprissa youth system and made his senior debut for them 2008. He left Saprissa for Ramonense before the 2010 Verano championship. He later played for Brujas in the CONCACAF Champions League and Herediano.

He was elected the season's best player after the 2011 Invierno when with Herediano but forced the club to sell him to rivals Saprissa in March 2012.

In June 2013 Saprissa sold Cordero to Thai football club Ratchaburi but in January 2014, he returned to Herediano to sign a three-year contract and apologize to the fans for insulting the club when he left for Saprissa in 2012. In May 2014, Cordero left Herediano by mutual consent.

References 

Belén estrenará planilla este domingo ante Saprissa‚ laprensalibre.cr, 17 January 2016

External links

1987 births
Living people
Footballers from San José, Costa Rica
Association football midfielders
Costa Rican footballers
Costa Rican expatriate footballers
Deportivo Saprissa players
A.D. Ramonense players
Brujas FC players
C.S. Herediano footballers
Jose Luis Cordero
L.D. Alajuelense footballers
A.D. San Carlos footballers
Belén F.C. players
Guadalupe F.C. players
Liga FPD players
Jose Luis Cordero
Costa Rican expatriate sportspeople in Thailand
Expatriate footballers in Thailand
Costa Rica under-20 international footballers